Alessandro Assolari (26 August 1928 – 13 April 2005) was an Italian Roman Catholic bishop.

Ordained to the priesthood on 13 March 1954 as a member of the Missionaries of the Company of Mary, Assolari was a priest in Madagascar from then until he moved to Malawi in 1961. He became the first vicar apostolic prefect of Mangochi, a predominantly Islamic area, in 1969. Assolari was named bishop of the Roman Catholic Diocese of Mangochi, Malawi on 8 December 1973. He signed the pastoral letter of March 1992, contributing to political reform in Malawi. He retired on 20 November 2004 and died on 13 April 2005.

References 

1928 births
2005 deaths
Clergy from the Province of Bergamo
Italian Roman Catholic bishops in Africa
20th-century Italian Roman Catholic bishops
Roman Catholic bishops of Mangochi